Jahanabad-e Sofla may refer to:
 Jahanabad-e Sofla, Golestan
 Jahanabad-e Sofla, Kohgiluyeh and Boyer-Ahmad
 Jahanabad-e Sofla, Sistan and Baluchestan

See also
 Jahanabad-e Pain